The 1874 Poole by-election was held on 26 May 1874.  It was caused by the election being declared void on petition, after "corrupt conduct and treating". It was retained by Liberal MP, Evelyn Ashley.

References

1874 in England
Politics of Poole
1874 elections in the United Kingdom
By-elections to the Parliament of the United Kingdom in Dorset constituencies
19th century in Dorset